SM U-106 was one of the 329 submarines serving in the Imperial German Navy in World War I. U-106 was commissioned on 28 July 1917, under the command of Kapitänleutnant Hans Hufnagel, and participated in one wartime patrol starting on 2 September 1917. She was lost off Terschelling after striking a mine on 7 October 1917.

Design
German Type U 93 submarines were preceded by the shorter Type U 87 submarines. U-106 had a displacement of  when at the surface and  while submerged. The submarine was powered by two  engines for use while surfaced, and two  engines for use while submerged. The boat had two propeller shafts and two  propellers.

U-106 was fitted with six  torpedo tubes (four at the bow and two at the stern), twelve to sixteen torpedoes, one  SK L/45, and one  SK L/30 deck gun. She had a complement of thirty-six (thirty-two crew members and four officers).

Wreck
In 2009 the Royal Netherlands Navy found the wreckage of the ship north of Terschelling, while charting sea-routes. The news was made public in March 2011, after the ship's identity had been confirmed by German authorities and the crewmembers' families had been informed. The ship will stay in place as a wargrave.

Summary of raiding history

References

Notes

Citations

Bibliography

World War I submarines of Germany
German Type U 93 submarines
Ships built in Kiel
1917 ships
U-boats commissioned in 1917
Maritime incidents in 1917
U-boats sunk by mines
U-boats sunk in 1917
Ships lost with all hands